Phycis is a genus of phycid hakes from the North Atlantic, including the Mediterranean Sea.

Species
There are currently three recognized species in this genus:
 Phycis blennoides (Brünnich, 1768) (Greater forkbeard)
 Phycis chesteri Goode & T. H. Bean, 1878 (Longfin hake)
 Phycis phycis (Linnaeus, 1766) (Forkbeard)

References

Phycidae
Marine fish genera
Taxa named by Johann Julius Walbaum